Harvey Campbell may refer to:

 Harvey Campbell (Canadian football) (born 1940), Canadian football player
 Harvey Campbell (politician) (1792–1877), American physician and politician